Corrhenes macmillani is a species of beetle in the family Cerambycidae. It was described by Gilmour in 1950.

References

Corrhenes
Beetles described in 1950